The New Croton Reservoir is a reservoir in Westchester County, New York, part of the New York City water supply system lying approximately  north of New York City. It is the collecting point for water from all reservoirs in the Croton Watershed.

History
In 1842 the Croton River, a tributary of the Hudson River, was impounded by the Old Croton Dam to create Croton Lake. New York City's first source of water beyond its city limits, its waters traveled by aqueduct to the Croton Distributing Reservoir in midtown Manhattan.

Construction on a New Croton Dam began in 1892.  In 1900, the workers (primarily Italian immigrants, Irish immigrants and African-Americans) constructing the dam went on strike to protest unfair wages. The New York State National Guard was called in to protect replacement workers and violence ensued.

In 1906 the New Croton Dam was completed, expanding the existing impoundment into the New Croton Reservoir, then the largest in the Croton Watershed, and thus one of the largest in the New York City water supply system to that point.

Its waters flow into the New Croton Aqueduct, then into the Jerome Park Reservoir in The Bronx. Water from the Jerome Park Reservoir is normally distributed to parts of Manhattan, The Bronx, and western Queens

Gallery

See also

Old Croton Aqueduct
New Croton Aqueduct
List of reservoirs and dams in New York
New York City water supply system

References

Croton Watershed
Protected areas of Westchester County, New York
Reservoirs in Westchester County, New York
Reservoirs in New York (state)
Somers, New York
1842 establishments in New York (state)